Araria Assembly constituency is an assembly constituency in Araria district in the Indian state of Bihar.

Overview
As per Delimitation of Parliamentary and Assembly constituencies Order, 2008, No 49  Araria Assembly constituency is composed of the following: Araria (community development block) including Araria nagar parishad.

Araria Assembly constituency is part of No 9 Araria (Lok Sabha constituency) (SC).

Members of Legislative Assembly 

^-bypoll

Election results

2020

2015

1977-2010
In the November 2010 state assembly elections, Zakir Hussain Khan of LJP won the Araria assembly seat defeating his nearest rival Narayan Kumar Jha of BJP. Contests in most years were multi cornered but only winners and runners up are being mentioned. Pradeep Kumar Singh of BJP defeated Moidur Rahman of Congress in October 2005 and February 2005. Vijay Kumar Mandal, Independent, defeated Moidur Rahman of Congress in 2000. Vijay Kumar Mandal of BPP defeated Durga Das Rathore of BJP in 1995. Vinod Kumar Roy, Independent, defeated Nand Kishore Mandal, Independent, in 1990. Halimuddin Ahmed of Congress defeated Nand Kishore Mandal of LD in 1985. Mohd. Taslimuddin of Janata Party (Secular – Charan Singh)  defeated Shrideo Jha of Congress in 1980. Srideo Jha of Congress defeated Deo Narayan Mishra of JP in 1977.

References

Assembly constituencies of Bihar
Politics of Araria district